The Molodohvardiiska coal mine is a large coal mine located in the southeast of Ukraine in Luhansk Oblast. Molodohvardiiska represents one of the largest coal reserves in Ukraine having estimated reserves of 63.6 million tonnes. The annual coal production is around 712,000 tonnes.

See also 

 Coal in Ukraine
 List of mines in Ukraine

References 

Coal mines in Ukraine
Coal mines in the Soviet Union
Economy of Luhansk Oblast